Packsaddle Island (5,640 feet) is a nunatak located in Wrangell-St. Elias National Park, in Alaska. It is surrounded by the Kennicott Glacier, and sits near the base of Mount Blackburn (16,390 feet).

References

Islands of Alaska
Islands of Unorganized Borough, Alaska
Nunataks